Bahlen may refer to the following places in Germany:

Bahlen (Boizenburg), a village in the municipality of Boizenburg, Mecklenburg-Vorpommern
Bahlen (Dinklage), a village in the municipality of Dinklage, Lower Saxony